Carbon is a 2018 Indian Malayalam-language adventure thriller film written and directed by Venu, starring Fahadh Faasil and Mamta Mohandas. The film follows Sebastian and Sameera on their expedition to find a lost treasure deep inside a forest. K. U. Mohanan was the cinematographer, while Vishal Bhardwaj and Bijibal composed the songs and the score, respectively. Principal photography took place between August and October 2017 in several hilly terrain locations in North Kerala.

Carbon was released in India on 19 January 2018 to positive response from the critics, particularly praising the visuals and Fahadh Faasil's performance. The film won six Kerala State Film Awards, the most awards for any film for that year.

Plot 
Sibi is a young adult who wants to make it big in the quickest possible way. His search for his goal leads him to be caretaker of a dilapidated palace. He plunges into the legends related to the palace and starts to search for treasure hidden somewhere in the surrounding jungle.

Cast 
 Fahadh Faasil as Sibi Stephen
 Mamta Mohandas as Sameera
 Manikandan R. Achari as Stalin
 Dileesh Pothan as Thamban
 Soubin Shahir as Aanakkaran Rajesh
 Chethan Jayalal as Kannan
 Kochu Preman as Balan Pillai
 Spadikam George as Stephen Varkey
 Vijayaraghavan as M. D.
 Nedumudi Venu as Basheer
 Sharaf U Dheen as Santhosh
 Praveena  as Deepa Pradeep
 Ashokan (Guest appearance)

Production
According to Venu, Fahadh was in his mind for the lead role from the beginning, "It was conceptualised and written with Fahadh in mind and I could not have made the film with someone else". Principal photography began by mid-August 2017. It was originally scheduled to begin by the end of March, but the "state-of-the-art" movie camera the makers ordered from abroad arrived only by August. The first schedule of filming that continued till mid-October completed inside the forests in Kattappana, Idukki district. Later it was shot in Erattupetta, Erumely, and Pala in Kottayam district, and in Wayanad. The film completely used sync sound. The film was shot in 12 locations, including Theni and Attappadi.

Music
The original songs were composed by Vishal Bhardwaj, with lyrics by Rafeeq Ahamed. The film score was composed by Bijibal.

Track listing
 "Thanne Thaane" - Benny Dayal
 "Doore Doore" - Rekha Bhardwaj
 "Kaatin Sarangi" - Benny Dayal

Release
The film was released on 19 January 2018.

Box office
The film collected $143,686 from 32 screens in the United Arab Emirates in the opening weekend (1 – 4 February) and $180,315 in two weeks.

Critical reception
Rating 4 out of 5 stars, Manoj Kumar R. of The Indian Express wrote "Venu has maintained a firm grip on the storytelling and beautifully brings out emotional conflicts in the characters in a well-written screenplay. Carbon is an engaging adventure film that should not be missed". Meera Suresh of The New Indian Express also gave 4 out of 5 and said "Carbon ultimately belongs to Venu. It is how he adds layers of meaning, without seeming to, that sets him apart. That he puts forth the most philosophical and thought-provoking concept in such an engaging and simple format is an attestation of his talent". The Times of India Deepa Soman rated 3.5 out of 5 stars and noted that "though an adventure thriller that keeps us on the edge of our seats, Carbon also prods your thoughts, through the protagonist’s journey, about these larger questions of purposes, revelations and perseverance". Baradwaj Rangan of Film Companion South wrote "The year has just dawned and I can state, with confidence, that it’s unlikely we see a stranger film, so richly atmospheric, so lyrical and literal at once"

Awards

Kerala State Film Awards
 Best Cinematographer - K. U. Mohanan
 Best Music Director - Vishal Bharadwaj
 Best Sound Recordist - Anil Radhakrishnan
 Best Sound Mixing - Sinoy Joseph
 Best Sound Design - Jayadevan Chakkadath
 Best Processing Lab/Colourist – Prime Focus

References

External links
 

2018 films
2010s Malayalam-language films
Films scored by Vishal Bhardwaj
Films scored by Bijibal
Indian adventure thriller films
Treasure hunt films